Stantsionno-Oyashinsky is an urban locality (an urban-type settlement) in Moshkovsky District of Novosibirsk Oblast, Russia. Population:

References

Urban-type settlements in Novosibirsk Oblast